This is a list of the extreme points of Colombia, the points that are farther north, south, east or west than any other location.

Latitude and longitude 
Geographic coordinates expressed in WGS 84.

Colombia 
 Northernmost point: Bajo Nuevo keys in San Andrés y Providencia Department
 Southernmost point: stream in Amazonas River, Leticia, in Amazonas Department
 Westernmost point: San Andrés Island in San Andrés y Providencia Department
 Easternmost point: San José Island in Rio Negro, in front of the Cocuy monolith in Guainía Department

Colombia (mainland) 

 Northernmost point: Punta Gallinas in Guajira Department
 Southernmost point: Amazonas River, Leticia, in Amazonas Department
 Westernmost point: Cabo Manglares in Nariño Department
 Easternmost point: San José Island in Rio Negro, in front of the Cocuy monolith in Guainía Department

Altitude 
Height refers to mean sea level.

 Highest point: Pico Cristóbal Colón in Magdalena Department, 5,775 m
 Lowest point: Pacific and Atlantic Ocean, 0 m

Geography of Colombia
Colombia